Zote may refer to:

 Zote (soap), a laundry soap brand
 Zote (village), a village in Mizoram, India
 Zote the Mighty, a character in the video game Hollow Knight